Killeagh is a village in east County Cork, Ireland.

Demographics
The population of Killeagh increased significantly between the 2002 census and 2016 census. The 2002 census recorded a population of 426, increasing to 521 (a 22.3% increase) by the 2006 census. By the 2016 census, the population had grown to 899. Of these, 87% were white Irish, less than 1% were white Irish travellers, 10% were other white ethnicities, 1% black, less than 1% Asian, with a similar number not stating their ethnicity. In terms of religion, Killeagh was 80% Catholic, 7% other stated religion, 12% had no religion, and less than 1% did not state a religion.

Amenities
Killeagh has a number of community facilities, including a primary school, church, convenience stores, post office, pharmacy, Garda station, veterinary clinic and public houses. It is served by daily bus services between Waterford, Youghal and Cork City.

Leisure amenities in the area include the Killeagh GAA grounds, and Glenbower Wood. The latter is situated along part of the Dissour River valley to the north of the village.

Since 2017, Killeagh has been home to Greywood Arts, an artist's residency and centre offering workshops and events.

The May Sunday Festival is a tradition in the village since the 1830s, when the De Capel Brooke family opened their estate (now Glenbower Wood) to the villagers to show off their improvements to the house and grounds.

Places and buildings of note

There are five buildings or other structures entered in the Record of Protected Structures, including Killeagh Mills, Saint John & Saint Virgilius Catholic Church, the Church of Ireland and Dromdiah Country House and Stables, which is located to the northeast of the village. The Thatch pub has been an unofficial village landmark for many years.

Notable people
 Mark Landers, All-Ireland winning captain of Cork in 1999 hurled for Killeagh.
 Joe Deane, a former squad member of the  Cork county panel 3 all-irelands and 3 all-stars.

References

External links

 GLENBOWER WOOD

Towns and villages in County Cork
Articles on towns and villages in Ireland possibly missing Irish place names
Civil parishes of County Cork